Ennakkad is a ward in Budhanoor Grama Panchayat, Alappuzha district in the Indian state of Kerala.

Location
Ennakkadu is surrounded by Chennithala, Gramam, Puliyoor, Mavelikkara, Budhanur and Mannar. Ennakkad has its own space in the history of Kerala and contributed significantly in the growth of Communism in Kerala. A heritage building in Ennakkadu is Ennakkadu palace.

Worship centres in Ennakkad

St Michael's Church Ennakkad
St Michael's Church is famous worship centre in Ennakkad. It belongs to Lactin Catholic and the festival of celebration in April 17th to 21st every year. St Michael's church is located near Ennakkad junction and opposite of St Mary's Church.

Devi Temple
Ennakkadu Devi temple is very famous. The official name of Ennakkad Devi temple is Naluvila Devi Temple. This temple is a family trust now and is owned and managed by the elder members of Kaduvinal Family. This temple was built by Kaduvinal family members in their own land for their religious purpose. Kaduvinal and Srattile families are very oldest family branches in Ennakkad. Kaduvinal and Srattile family members are relatives to each other. Kaduvinal family members were involved in various decision makings of the Temple Festivals. The temple festival is on "Bharani" Nakshathram in the Malayalam month of  Meenam.

History
A remote forested area lying east of Kuttamperoor, south of Budhanoor, west of Puliyoor, north of Mavelikara had wild animals and thick vegetation with tall wild trees.

Ennakkad as a human settlement, shown an urban characters in the past. Then there was a decline  during 80s and 90s. Now again ennakkad is in the path of urbanism.

Geography
It is surrounded by a river, and beautiful green paddy fields. This village still have narrow pedestrian lines with full of shady trees leading to small jungle like" KAVU". All governing offices of  Bhudhanoor panchayath like Panchayath office and Village offices are situated in Ennakkad.

Demographics
 India census, Ennakkad had a population of 18,563 with 8,839 males and 9,724 females.

References

Villages in Alappuzha district